Medium Rare is a compilation album by the Mighty Mighty Bosstones, released on December 18, 2007, on Big Rig Records. It contains three new songs, nine previously unreleased tracks and some rare B-sides. This is also the band's first release since they went on hiatus in 2003.

Track listing
All songs were written and composed by Dicky Barrett and Joe Gittleman.

"This List" - 4:21
"The Meaning" - 2:34
"Don't Worry Desmond Dekker" - 3:38
"To California" - 3:11
"The One with the Woes All Over It" - 2:59
"So Many Ways" - 2:36
"A Reason to Toast" - 2:58
"Who's Fooling Who?" - 2:33
"Katie" - 3:10
"This Time of Year" - 2:17
"Chocolate Pudding" - 3:01
"Is It?" - 2:52
"Favorite Records" - 4:36

Song information
"This List", "Don't Worry Desmond Dekker" and "The One with the Woes All Over It" are brand new songs, recorded and produced by the Bosstones during the fall of 2007.
"The Meaning" and "Favorite Records" are B-sides from the Pay Attention sessions (2000). "The Meaning" was released as a vinyl bonus track on Pay Attention while "Favorite Records" is previously unreleased. It seems to be a song about Phil Spector.
"To California" and "Katie" are previously unreleased tracks from A Jackknife to a Swan sessions (2002).
"Is It?", "So Many Ways" and "Who's Fooling Who?" are B-sides from the Let's Face It sessions (1997). "Is It?" appears on "The Impression That I Get" (Australian/UK) single (1997) and The Rascal King (US) 7" single (1998). "So Many Ways" appears on the second UK The Impression That I Get single (1997). An alternate version of "Who's Fooling Who?" appears on the compilation CD Mashin' Up the Nation, Best of American Ska Volumes 3 & 4 (1998).
"This Time of Year" and "A Reason to Toast" were originally recorded in 2001 (along with other songs that would later appear on A Jackknife to a Swan). "This Time of Year" originally appears on a promotional Bosstones CD given out during the 2001 Hometown Throwdown and A Santa Cause: It's a Punk Rock Christmas (2003). An extended version of "A Reason to Toast" appears on an EP split with Madcap (2001).
"Chocolate Pudding" was a B-side from the Question the Answers sessions (1994). It originally appears as a bonus track on Question the Answers (Japanese import version), the "Kinder Words" single (1994), and the Here We Go Again EP (1995).

Personnel
Dicky Barrett - lead vocals
Tim "Johnny Vegas" Burton - saxophone
Ben Carr - manager and "Bosstone", vocals
Joe Gittleman - bass, background vocals
Lawrence Katz - guitar, background vocals
Joe Sirois - drums
Chris Rhodes - trombone
Roman Fleysher - saxophone
Nate Albert - guitar, background vocals
Dennis Brockenborough - trombone
Kevin Lenear - saxophone
Dave Aaronoff - keyboards, background vocals

References

The Mighty Mighty Bosstones compilation albums
B-side compilation albums
2007 compilation albums